Włodzimierz Mazur (18 April 1954 – 1 December 1988) was a Polish professional footballer who played as a striker.

He played mostly for Zagłębie Sosnowiec and spent two seasons in France with Stade Rennais. He made 23 appearances scoring 2 goals for the Poland national team and was a participant at the 1978 FIFA World Cup.

In 1988, he died suddenly at the age of 34.

References

External links
 
 

1954 births
1988 deaths
People from Opatów
Sportspeople from Świętokrzyskie Voivodeship
Association football forwards
Polish footballers
1978 FIFA World Cup players
Poland international footballers
Zagłębie Sosnowiec players
Stade Rennais F.C. players
Ekstraklasa players
Ligue 1 players
Polish expatriate footballers
Expatriate footballers in France